Cha Yong-Hwa is a North Korean artistic gymnast. She competed at the 2007 World Championships, and represented North Korea at the 2008 Olympic Games, replacing Hong Su-Jong.

At the 2006 Asian Games, Cha received a silver medal with the North Korean team and an individual bronze medal on the uneven bars. At the 2008 Asian Artistic Gymnastics Championships, she won a silver medal on the uneven bars.

At the 2008 Olympics, Cha competed on two events, uneven bars and balance beam, in the preliminary round of competition. On bars, she scored a 15.175, which left her 12th out of all competitors in the meet, and qualified her as the third reserve for the bars event final.

In 2009, Cha competed at the Summer Universiade in Belgrade, winning a bronze medal with the team and a silver medal on the uneven bars. Later in the year, she competed at the World Championships, where she qualified to the uneven bars final and finished in fifth place.

Cha's birth date had been listed as 8 January 1990, but in 2014 the FIG took disciplinary action after discovering that Cha's passport had been modified and her age falsified. Her individual results since August 2006, and the results of any team she was part of, have been nullified.

References

External links
 
 

North Korean female artistic gymnasts
Gymnasts at the 2008 Summer Olympics
Olympic gymnasts of North Korea
Living people
Gymnasts at the 2006 Asian Games
Year of birth missing (living people)
Asian Games competitors for North Korea
21st-century North Korean women